Yuzhny Okrug may refer to:
Southern Federal District (Yuzhny federalny okrug), a federal district of Russia
Southern Administrative Okrug (Yuzhny administrativny okrug), an administrative okrug of Moscow, Russia

See also
 Yuzhny (disambiguation)